Charles Henry Scherza (February 15, 1923 – March 16, 2014) was a Canadian professional ice hockey player. He played 36 games in the National Hockey League with the Boston Bruins and New York Rangers between 1943 and 1945. The rest of his career, which lasted from 1943 to 1959, was mainly spent in the American Hockey League, where he played 11 seasons, winning a Calder Cup championship with the Providence Reds in 1949. He was born in Brandon, Manitoba and died on March 16, 2014, at the age of 91.

Career statistics

Regular season and playoffs

Awards and achievements
Calder Cup (AHL) Championship (1949)
Honoured Member of the Manitoba Hockey Hall of Fame

References

External links

1923 births
2014 deaths
Boston Bruins players
Canadian expatriates in the United States
Canadian ice hockey centres
Hershey Bears players
Ice hockey people from Manitoba
New York Rangers players
Ontario Hockey Association Senior A League (1890–1979) players
Oshawa Generals players
Providence Reds players
Sportspeople from Brandon, Manitoba